The Trichocomaceae are a family of fungi in the order Eurotiales. Taxa are saprobes with aggressive colonization strategies, adaptable to extreme environmental conditions. Family members are cosmopolitan in distribution, ubiquitous in soil, and common associates of decaying plant and food material. The family contains some of the most familiar fungi, such as Penicillium and Aspergillus. It has been proposed that the family should be split into the three families Aspergillaceae, Thermoascaceae and Trichocomaceae.

Genera

Aspergillus
Byssochlamys
Capsulotheca
Chaetosartorya
Chaetotheca
Chromocleista
Citromyces
Cristaspora
Dendrosphaera
Dichlaena
Dichotomomyces
Edyuillia
Emericella
Erythrogymnotheca
Eupenicillium
Eurotium
Fennellia
Hamigera
Hemicarpenteles
Neocarpenteles
Neopetromyces
Neosartorya
Paecilomyces
Penicilliopsis
Penicillium
Petromyces
Phialosimplex
Rasamsonia
Sagenoma
Sagenomella
Sclerocleista
Sphaeromyces
Stilbodendron
Talaromyces
Thermoascus
Torulomyces 
Trichocoma
Warcupiella
mitosporic Trichocomaceae

References

Cannon PF, Kirk PM.  (2007). Fungal Families of the World. CABI: Singapore. 456 pp.
Pitt JL, Samson RA, Frisvad JC. (2000). List of accepted species and their synonyms in the family Trichocomaceae. Integration of Modern Taxonomic Methods for Penicillium and Aspergillus Classification (Amsterdam): 9–49.

External links

 
Ascomycota families
Taxa described in 1897